The 37th New York Infantry Regiment or the Irish Rifles was formed accepted by the State on May 25, 1861, and organized in New York City. The regiment mustered in the service of the United States  on June 6 and 7, 1861 for two years of service to June 22, 1863.

The 75th New York Militia formed the nucleus of the regiment. Several companies were recruited: H at Allegany, I at Ellicottsville, K at Pulaski, and all others at New York City. Men from the 101st New York Volunteer Infantry joined this regiment by transfer on December 24, 1862. An on May 25, 1863, men who had served were consolidated into two companies and these were transferred to the 40th Infantry as Companies I and K.

Service
The 37th New York had its roots in the 75th New York State Militia, organized in 1856 by John H. McCunn, colonel; James Haggerty, lieutenant colonel; and Dennis C. Minton, major. The 75th was disbanded in 1856, but was revived in April 1861 when President Abraham Lincoln issued his call to arms.

After leaving the State of New York on June 23, 1861, the regiment served at and near Washington D.C. until March 1862. They camped at the foot of East Capitol Street.  An incident between Colonel John H. McCunn and 1st Lieutenant Robert F. Hunter who was then serving with the provost guard. McCunn was found guilty of conduct "prejudicial to the good order and military discipline" though also directed to "resume his sword and duties." Their service continued in Col. John H. McCunn's Brigade in the Army of Northeastern Virginia from July 21, 1861.

The regiment continued in Hunter's Brigade, Division of the Potomac from August 4, 1861. Next they served in Richardson's Brigade from August 22, 1861; in same brigade, Heintzelman's Division, Army of the Potomac, from October 15, 1861.

The regiment participated in the First Battle of Bull Run in Gen. McDowell's reserves and went into winter quarters near Bailey's cross-roads. After several temporary assignments the regiment finally became a part of the 3d brigade, 1st division, 3d corps from March 13, 1862.

Companies H and I served detached from the regiment at Fort Washington, D. C., from August, 1861, to March, 1862. The regiment embarked for Fortress Monroe in March 1862. It was active in the Siege of Yorktown (1862). While at Williamsburg they received a complimentary mention from General Philip Kearny for gallantry in action. During this battle 95 were killed, wounded, or found to be missing.

At the Battle of Fair Oaks and in the Seven Days' battles the regiment was closely engaged, after which it went into camp at Harrison's landing; moved from there to Alexandria; was present at the battles of Bull Run and Chantilly; reached Fal-mouth Dec. 6, 1862; was active at Fredericksburg with a total loss of 35 members; and encamped near Falmouth during the rest of the winter.

On Dec. 24, 1862, the regiment received the veterans of the 101st N. Y. The heaviest loss was suffered in the Chancellorsville campaign in May, 1863, when 222 of the 37th were killed, wounded or missing. A report from Major William DeLacy recounted the actions of this encounter in detail. The regiment struck tents the morning of April 28 and marched about 6 miles toward the Rappahannock River where they encamped. They crossed the river on May 1 at about 11am. They defended a battery on the front and then to connect with the left of General Howard's command. A night attack was undertaken at around 11pm. DeLacey recounted how the regiment "Drove some troops from the rifle-pits on our right." On May 3 while the brigade was moving to the rear of the Union lines, a deadly attack on the front and left flank caused confusion and forced the regiment to fall back. ?The regiment was later reformed and fell back.

The three years men were transferred to the 40th N. Y. on May 29, 1863. On June 22, 1863, the regiment was mustered out at New York City under the command of Col. S. B. Hayman.

Total strength and casualties
During its service the regiment lost by death, killed in action, 3 officers, 52 enlisted men; of wounds received in action, 2 officers, 24 enlisted men; of disease and other causes, 1 officer, 57 enlisted men; total, 6 officers, 113 enlisted men; aggregate, 119; of whom 2 enlisted men died in the hands of the enemy.

Commanders & Regimental staff
 Colonel John H. McCunn, from June 8 to August 31, 1861.
 Colonel Samuel B. Hayman, from September 28, 1861, to June 22, 1863.
 Lieutenant Colonel John Burke, from May 28, 1861, to February 6, 1862.
 Lieutenant Colonel Gilbert Riordan, from January 21, 1862, to June 22, 1863.
 Major Dennis C. Minton, from June 7, 1861, to September 4, 1861.
 Major Gilbert Riordan, from September 4, 1861, to January 21, 1862.
 Major Patrick Henry Jones, from January 21, 1862, to October 8, 1862.
 Major William DeLacy, from October 8, 1862, to June 22, 1863.
 Captain John Torboss Underhill
 Adjutant Cornelius Murphy, from June 7, 1861, to November 4, 1861.
 Adjutant Patrick H. Jones, from November 8, 1861, to January 21, 1862.
 Adjutant James Henry, from January 21, 1862, to June 22, 1863.
 Quartermaster Charles H. Hoyt, from June 8, 1861, to June 8, 1862.
 Quartermaster John Phalon, from April 23, 1862, to June 22, 1863.
 Surgeon John McNulty, from June 7 to October 6, 1861.
 Surgeon William O'Meagher, from October 10, 1861, to June 22, 1863.
 Assistant Surgeon William O'Meagher, from June 8, 1861, to October 10, 1861.
 Assistant Surgeon John P. Phillips, from October 11, 1861, to February 20, 1863.
 Assistant Surgeon William B. Schermerhorn, from September 6, 1862, to June 22, 1863.
 Chaplain Peter Tissot, S.J., from May 25, 1861, to June 22, 1863.

Medal of Honor Recipients
 James Rowan O'Beirne. During Battle of Seven Pines between May 31, 1862 – June 1, 1862, awarded Medal of Honor for gallantly maintaining the line of battle until ordered to fall back.
 Timothy Fallon. Age at muster, 23 years. Enlisted, May 25, 1861, at New York City, to serve two years; mustered in as private, Company K, June 7, 1861; discharged, Dec. 13, 1862, to re-enlist in Battery K, Fourth United States Artillery; awarded the Medal of Honor, Feb. 7, 1891, for gallantry in action in Battle of Williamsburg, Virginia, Battle of Seven Pines, Virginia, and Big Shanty, Ga. At Williamsburg, Virginia, assisted in driving rebel skirmishers to their main line. Participated in action, at Fair Oaks, Virginia, though excused from duty because of disability. In a charge with his company at Big Shanty, Ga., was the first man on the enemy's works.
 Martin Conboy. Age at muster, 34 years. Enlisted, Aug. 2, 1861, at New York City, to serve two years; mustered in as private, Company K, Aug. 3, 1861; transferred to Company B and promoted sergeant, Dec. 9, 1861; first sergeant, no date; mustered in as second lieutenant, Oct. 20, 1862; mustered out with company, June 22, 1863, at New York City. During the Battle of Williamsburg he took command of the company in action, the captain having been wounded, the other commissioned officers being absent, and handled it with skill and bravery. For this service he was awarded the Medal of Honor. Commissioned second lieutenant, Dec. 24, 1862, with rank from Oct. 20, 1862, vice J.O.C. Doyle, dismissed.

Other sources
 List of New York Civil War regiments
 Civil War in the East - Chronology of the 37th NY Regiment

Notes

Military units and formations in New York (state)
1861 establishments in New York (state)
Infantry 37